Gonostoma is a genus of bristlemouths.

Species
There are three extant species recognized in this genus:
 Gonostoma atlanticum Norman, 1930 (Atlantic fangjaw)
 Gonostoma denudatum Rafinesque, 1810
 Gonostoma elongatum Günther, 1878 (Elongated bristlemouth fish)
Moreover, there is the fossil species
 Gonostoma dracula Grădianu et al., 2017
G. dracula lived in the Oligocene, in what is today Romania, and at the time of life was the Paratethys sea.

References

Gonostomatidae
Taxa named by Constantine Samuel Rafinesque
Marine fish genera